Oakley Observatory or Rose–Hulman Observatory (Obs. code: 916) is an astronomical observatory operated by Rose–Hulman Institute of Technology in Terre Haute, Indiana, United States.

The Oakley Observatory is a teaching observatory with eight permanently mounted telescopes. One of the telescopes is a six-inch refractor built by Clark and Sons in 1886. The other telescopes are all reflecting telescopes ranging in size from eight to twenty two inches. In addition to being used for astronomy classes students use the observatory for research and recreation. Several minor planets have been discovered at Rose-Hulman, most notably numerous discoveries by American astronomer Chris Wolfe (also see :Category:Discoveries by Chris Wolfe).

List of discovered minor planets 

In addition, the Minor Planet Center credits the discovery of the following minor planets directly to the Oakley observatory:

See also 
 
 List of observatories

References

External links 
 Oakley Observatory
 Astrometry

Astronomical observatories in Indiana
Buildings and structures in Terre Haute, Indiana
Minor-planet discovering observatories
Rose–Hulman Institute of Technology
Tourist attractions in Terre Haute, Indiana